The Albany State Golden Rams football team represents Albany State University (ASU) in the sport of American football. The Golden Rams compete in the Division II of the National Collegiate Athletics Association (NCAA) and in the East Division of the Southern Intercollegiate Athletic Conference (SIAC). They play their home games at Albany State University Coliseum on the university's Albany, Georgia, campus, and are currently led by coach Gabe Giardina.

In 2003, the Golden Rams played Fayetteville State in the Pioneer Bowl. Albany State won, 52–30.

The Albany State Golden Rams were named the 2010 SBN Black college Football National Champions.

Former Golden Rams players that have played in the NFL include current Indianapolis Colt Grover Stewart, former Golden Rams Head Coaches Mike White and Dan Land, Steve Carter, Kenneth Gant, Arthur Green, Jeff Hunter, Keyon Nash, Clarence Benford III and Chris Sheffield.

Rapper Rick Ross played briefly for the Golden Rams during the mid 1990s.

Rivalries

Fort Valley State University
The rivalry began in the first meeting of the two schools in 1945, when FVSU beat ASU, 27-21. The two schools did not play each other in 1946 and 1947. While the rivalry between the two teams spans more than half a century, Fountain City Classic officials moved the game to Columbus in 1990 to attract more corporate support. FVSU leads the series 44–39–4.

Fort Valley State won their last meeting in 2022, 31-21.

Head coaches

Championships

SEAC
1955, 1957, 1959, 1960, 1962, 1966

SIAC
1984, 1985, 1986, 1988, 1993, 1994, 1995, 1996, 1997, 2003, 2004, 2005, 2006, 2010, 2013, 2021

SIAC East Division
2011, 2013, 2014, 2015, 2018, 2019, 2021

Pioneer Bowl
2003

Black college national
2003, 2004, 2010

Postseason

Bowl games

NCAA Division II playoffs

All-Americans

NFL draft picks

Undrafted
Players that went undrafted but spent at least one season on a team's active roster.

Steve Carter: Tampa Bay Buccaneers (1987)
Arthur Green: New Orleans Saints (1972)
Dan Land: Tampa Bay Buccaneers (1987), Los Angeles/Oakland Raiders (1989-1997)
Chris Sheffield: Pittsburgh Steelers (1986-1987), Detroit Lions (1987)

References

External links
 

 
American football teams established in 1923
1923 establishments in Georgia (U.S. state)